The 1979 Georgia Bulldogs football team represented the Georgia Bulldogs of the University of Georgia during the 1979 NCAA Division I-A football season.

Schedule

Roster

Game summaries

South Carolina

at Ole Miss

LSU

    
    
    
    
    

Scott Woerner recovered a fumble with just over two minutes remaining with LSU driving at the Georgia 22 to seal the upset.

vs. Florida

References

Georgia
Georgia Bulldogs football seasons
Georgia Bulldogs football